Gutbrod was a German manufacturer of cars, motorcycles and small agricultural machinery.  The firm was founded in Ludwigsburg, Germany by Wilhelm Gutbrod in 1926.  It originally built "Standard" branded motorcycles.  In 1933 the company relocated to the nearby Stuttgart suburb of Feuerbach, and from 1933 to 1935, Standard Superior cars were built with rear-mounted engines.

An updated version of the Gutbrod Superior introduced in 1953 benefited from developments towards fuel injection undertaken by Mercedes-Benz dating initially from 1935: this Gutbrod was the first car in the world to be offered with fuel injection, some three years before fuel injection appeared in a production engine offered by Mercedes themselves.

The small Gutbrod Superior model was produced from 1950 to 1954 using the company's own, front-mounted twin-cylinder two-stroke engines initially of 593cc. In April 1953 the engine size was increased to 663 cc for more expensive 'Luxus 700' versions of the car, while the standard model continued to be offered with the original smaller engine. Press reports commended the speed and secure handling of the cars but indicated that the sporty handling came in return for sacrificing some comfort. It was also noted that normal conversation became impossible at speeds above about 80 km/h (50 mph) due to the noise.

7726 cars were produced before the factory was forced to close.  The car was developed at the company's small factory at Plochingen am Neckar by Technical Director Dr. Hans Scherenberg during the time of Walter Gutbrod who had taken over the firm in 1948 on the death of his father, Wilhelm Gutbrod (26 February 1890 - 9 August 1948).  Scherenberg arrived at Gutbrod from Mercedes where the victorious war-time allies had enforced a pause in engine fuel-injection development, and in 1952 he would return to that firm.

A Gutbrod injection engine can still be seen in the Deutsches Museum in Munich.

The car was offered as standard version for a price of DM 3990, and as Superior Luxus for DM 4380. Recently, a restoration project of an injection model was sold in Geneva for CHF 3000.

In 1956, the Norwegian Troll car was built on a Gutbrod chassis. pioneering the use of fibreglass in automobile coachwork along with the Chevrolet Corvette as well as some other small scale car manufacturers.

Vehicles 

Threewheeler
Progress 200
Standard Hermes
Standard P203 and P503
Standard E1

Vans and pickup trucks
Standard Merkur
Standard Progress
Standard H204, H504, HV504, H254
Standard Heck 504, 604
Gutbrod Atlas 800, 1000, 1000/3, 800/H, 700

Passenger cars
Standard Superior 500
Gutbrod Superior, Superior Sport-Roadster, Superior Kombinationswagen (Stationwagon), SuperiorLuxus 700 
Gutbrod Superior Viersitzer 600 (Fourseater)
Gutbrod Farmax

Tractors
Gutbrod ND 15
Gutbrod ND 25
Gutbrod ND 36

Further reading
 (German) Otfried Jaus, und Peter Kaiser: Standard Motorräder – Gutbrod PKW und Lieferwagen – Neben den Grossen - Handwerklicher und Kleinindustrieller Fahrzeugbau in Württemberg , Johan Kleine Vennekate Verlag, Lemgo 2019,

References

External links

 German Standard-Gutbrod-Friends Interest Community
 Standard-Gutbrod Forum

Vehicle manufacturing companies established in 1926
Defunct motor vehicle manufacturers of Germany
Rear-engined vehicles
Rear-wheel-drive vehicles